Simmer is a German habitational surname for someone from Simmern. Notable people with the name include:
 Charlie Simmer (1954), Canadian former professional ice hockey forward
 Grant Simmer (1957), Australian sailor and yacht designer
 Judith Simmer-Brown, Tibetan buddhist from the United States
 Karen Simmer, Australian paediatrician

German-language surnames
German toponymic surnames